Echinodorus emersus is a species of plant in the family Alismataceae from South America.

References

Further reading
Lehtonen, Samuli. "Systematics of the Alismataceae—A morphological evaluation." Aquatic Botany 91.4 (2009): 279–290.
Lehtonen, Samuli. "Indeling van het geslacht Echinodorus."

External links

emersus
Flora of South America
Aquatic plants
Plants described in 2008